Compulsion is a 2013 Canadian psychological thriller film directed by Egidio Coccimiglio and starring Heather Graham, Carrie-Anne Moss, Kevin Dillon, and Joe Mantegna. The movie is a remake of the South Korean film 301, 302 directed by Park Chul-soo. It focuses on two women occupying neighboring apartments, each one grappling with psychological disorders that begin to overtake their lives. According to the film’s press release: "With images of sumptuous food and sensual enjoyment, the film explores the intimacy between the two through their connection with food, eating disorders and sex.  In a battle of wills, one woman overflows with illusions and fearlessly faces life while the other withdraws from everything and fearlessly faces death."

The movie opened for limited release on June 21, 2013.

Plot
Amy (Heather Graham), an obsessive chef, befriends a bulimic former child star Saffron (Carrie-Anne Moss) living in the apartment next door, sparking a fiery battle of wills. Unstable Amy wields a spatula like a samurai, and dreams of the day she'll have her own cooking show. As a young girl, Amy was infatuated with a television show starring Saffron, who subsequently vanished into obscurity. The damaged daughter of a tyrannical stage mother, Saffron has struggled with an eating disorder ever since she was a little girl. Plagued by deep-rooted intimacy issues, she spends most of her time alone until the day she crosses paths with Amy. At first, Amy can't believe her luck at having her childhood idol living right next door, and at first the two women even sense an ethereal connection that bonds them. Later, as their true colors begin to emerge, both Amy and Saffron discover just how toxic their chemistry may be.

Cast

Production
Although the film takes place in New York City, principal photography took place in 
Sault Ste. Marie and Toronto, Ontario.

Reception
Charlie Schmidlin of IndieWire stated "Sustaining a post-child-star career seems a difficult enough labyrinth to manage by itself, but combine that challenge with a bubbly, incessant neighbor intent on stardom, as a new film exploring the toll of celebrity aims to do, and you have an interesting dark vehicle for two talented actresses as a result." Chuck Wilson of the Miami New Times commented "The game of wills [...] between the two women isn't terribly interesting, much less suspenseful, and in fact, it's not clear that director Egidio Coccimiglio and screenwriter Floyd Byars ever settled on whether they were making a thriller or a satire about food and celebrity. The ever-vibrant Graham has fun with Amy's slyly embittered patter to her imaginary TV audience, while Moss valiantly commits herself to Saffron's psychological pain."

See also
301, 302, the original, released in 1995.
Girl, Interrupted, a 1999 drama film.

References

External links

2013 films
Canadian psychological thriller films
English-language Canadian films
2013 psychological thriller films
Films shot in Sault Ste. Marie, Ontario
2010s erotic thriller films
Canadian independent films
2013 independent films
Dimension Films films
Canadian erotic thriller films
2010s English-language films
2010s Canadian films